Mauny is a commune in the Seine-Maritime department in the Normandy region in northern France.

Geography

Heraldry

Population

Places of interest
 The church of St.Jean & St.Martin, dating from the seventeenth century.
 The chapel of St.Nicholas, dating from the fifteenth century, rebuilt in 1700.
 The eighteenth century château de Mauny.
 The Château du Val-des-Leux.
 The old quarries, used for 300 years for building stone for the churches of Rouen.

See also
Communes of the Seine-Maritime department

References

Communes of Seine-Maritime